Aleksandr Markin may refer to:

Aleksandr Markin (footballer) (1949–1996), Soviet Russian footballer
Aleksandr Markin (hurdler) (born 1962), Soviet Russian track and field athlete